"What Would You Do?" is a song recorded by American hip hop trio City High. It was released in March 2001 as the lead single from their self-titled debut album (2001). The track was originally included on the 1999 soundtrack of the film Life, starring Eddie Murphy and Martin Lawrence. It peaked at number eight on the US Billboard Hot 100, number two in Australia and Ireland, and number three in the United Kingdom. The version of the song on their debut album differs from that included on the Life soundtrack as it features a sample of Dr. Dre's hit song "The Next Episode".

The song was nominated for Best R&B Performance by a Duo or Group with Vocal in the 2002 edition of the Grammys but lost to Destiny's Child's "Survivor".

Content
The song, along with the accompanying music video, was likely intended as a motivational anthem for single parents dealing with poverty and especially acknowledging all the single mothers who feel forced into prostitution due to the need to support their children. It encourages them to keep strong and keep going on for the sake of their loved ones. However, it has also come under criticism for its victim-blaming approach, for example the verse where the woman is accused of making "tired excuses".

Track listings

US CD single
 "What Would You Do?" (album version)
 "What Would You Do?" (instrumental)
 "Caramel" (snippet)
 "Best Friends" (snippet)
 "Didn't Ya" (snippet)

UK CD single
 "What Would You Do?" (album version) – 2:50
 "It Ain't the Same" – 3:41
 "What Would You Do?" (X-Men vocal remix) – 4:22
 "What Would You Do?" (CD-ROM video) – 3:18

UK 12-inch single
A1. "What Would You Do?" (album version) – 2:50
A2. "What Would You Do?" (instrumental mix) – 2:48
B1. "What Would You Do?" (X-Men remix) – 4:22

UK cassette single
 "What Would You Do?" (album version) – 2:50
 "What Would You Do?" (X-Men vocal remix) – 4:22

European CD single
 "What Would You Do?" (album version)
 "What Would You Do?" (X-Men remix)

Australian CD single
 "What Would You Do?" (album version)
 "What Would You Do?" (X-Men remix)
 "What Would You Do?" (instrumental)
 "What Would You Do?" (video)

Charts

Weekly charts

Year-end charts

Certifications

Release history

References

1999 songs
2001 debut singles
City High songs
Interscope Records singles
Song recordings produced by Wyclef Jean
Songs about parenthood
Songs written by Dr. Dre
Songs written by Ryan Toby
Songs written by Snoop Dogg